The trade-weighted US dollar index, also known as the broad index, is a measure of the value of the United States dollar relative to other world currencies. It is a trade weighted index that improves on the older U.S. Dollar Index by incorporating more currencies and yearly rebalancing.  The base index value is 100 in January 1997.  As the U.S. Dollar gains value the index increases.

History
The trade-weighted dollar index was introduced in 1998 for two primary reasons.  The first was the introduction of the euro, which eliminated several of the currencies in the standard dollar index; the second was to keep pace with new developments in US trade.

Included currencies
In the older U.S. Dollar Index, a significant weight is given to the euro, because most U. S. Trade in 1973 was with European countries. As U. S. trade expanded over time, the weights in that index went unchanged and became out of date.  To more accurately reflect the strength of the dollar relative to other world currencies, the Federal Reserve created the trade-weighted US dollar index, which includes a bigger collection of currencies than the US dollar index. The regions included are:

 Europe (euro countries)
 Canada
 Japan
 Mexico
 China
 United Kingdom
 Taiwan
 Korea
 Singapore

 Hong Kong
 Malaysia
 Brazil
 Switzerland
 Thailand
 Philippines
 Australia
 Indonesia
 India

 Israel
 Saudi Arabia
 Russia
 Sweden
 Argentina
 Venezuela
 Chile
 Colombia

Mathematical formulation

Based on nominal exchange rates
The index is computed as the geometric mean of the bilateral exchange rates of the included currencies.  The weight assigned to the value of each currency in the calculation is based on trade data, and is updated annually (the value of the index itself is updated much more frequently than the weightings).  The index value at time  is given by the formula:

.

where

  is the number of currencies in the index at time 
  is the weight of currency  at time 
 and

Based on real exchange rates
The real exchange rate is a more informative measure of the dollar's worth since it accounts for countries whose currencies experience differing rates of inflation from that of the United States.  This is compensated for by adjusting the exchange rates in the formula using the consumer price index of the respective countries.  In this more general case the index value is given by:

.

where

Federal Reserve Bank of St. Louis data

The Federal Reserve Bank of St. Louis, provides "weighted averages of the foreign exchange value of the U.S. dollar against the currencies of a broad group of major U.S. trading partners" with detailed information. The "broad currency index includes the Euro Area, Canada, Japan, Mexico, China, United Kingdom, Taiwan, Korea, Singapore, Hong Kong, Malaysia, Brazil, Switzerland, Thailand, Philippines, Australia, Indonesia, India, Israel, Saudi Arabia, Russia, Sweden, Argentina, Venezuela, Chile and Colombia."

This table shows some highs and lows of the Trade Weighted U.S. Dollar Index: Broad [TWEXB] from 2002 to April 2017.

References

External links
Trade weighted dollar indexes at St. Louis Fed

Economic indicators of United States currencies